L'Amicale Française was a former Mexican football team that played in the Primera Fuerza prior to the professionalization and development of the Mexican first division. The club was established in 1915.

History
L'Amicale Française was founded in 1919 by the French migrates that lived in Mexico City.The club was not allowed to participate in the league till the 1914/1915 tournament. The club only participated that in that tournament playing 10 games with a record of 2 wins, 3 draws, 5 losses scaring 10 goals and allowing 10 finishing in 5 place with 7 points. The club fell apart because many players return to France to defend their homeland. Emilio Spittalier former player and co founder of the club who had originally migrate d to Mexico in 1910 return after fighting in France and help revive the club. The club played one more tournament in 1920–21 In the Campeonato del Centenario tournament to celebrated the 100 year Independence anniversary. The club would reach the semifinals where they lost to Asturias F.C. 5–3 matches played on September 16 and 18. The club would struggle for a few years till 1924 when the club was dissolve many of the French player transfer to rivals clubs México FC and Germania FV.

Primera Fuerza

From 19014–15

References

 Juan Cid y Mulet: Libro de Oro del Fútbol Mexicano (Mexiko Stadt: B. Costa Amica, 1961), S. 88f

See also
Football in Mexico

Defunct football clubs in Mexico City
Association football clubs established in 1911
French diaspora in North America
Primera Fuerza teams